Glyphidocera barythyma is a moth in the family Autostichidae. It was described by Edward Meyrick in 1929. It is found in North America, where it has been recorded from Florida, Indiana and Texas.

The wingspan is 13–15 mm. The forewings are light grayish ocherous rather closely sprinkled with dark fuscous with a small cloudy dark fuscous spot in the disc at one-fifth. The stigmata are moderate, cloudy, dark fuscous, the first discal rather large, the plical rather obliquely before it, an additional dot directly beneath the second discal and confluent with it. There is a fuscous line on the upper part of the termen. The hindwings are light gray.

References

Moths described in 1929
Glyphidocerinae